In functional analysis and related areas of mathematics, a complete topological vector space is a topological vector space (TVS) with the property that whenever points get progressively closer to each other, then there exists some point  towards which they all get closer. 
The notion of completeness for TVSs uses the theory of uniform spaces as a framework to generalize the notion of completeness for metric spaces. 
But unlike metric-completeness, TVS-completeness does not depend on any metric and is defined for  TVSs, including those that are not metrizable or Hausdorff.

Completeness is an extremely important property for a topological vector space to possess. 
The notions of completeness for normed spaces and metrizable TVSs, which are commonly defined in terms of completeness of a particular norm or metric, can both be reduced down to this notion of TVS-completeness – a notion that is independent of any particular norm or metric. 
A metrizable topological vector space  with a translation invariant metric  is complete as a TVS if and only if  is a complete metric space, which by definition means that every -Cauchy sequence converges to some point in  
Prominent examples of complete TVSs that are also metrizable include all F-spaces and consequently also all Fréchet spaces, Banach spaces, and Hilbert spaces. 
Prominent examples of complete TVS that are (typically)  metrizable include strict LF-spaces such as the space of test functions  with it canonical LF-topology, the strong dual space of any non-normable Fréchet space, as well as many other polar topologies on continuous dual space or other topologies on spaces of linear maps.

Explicitly, a topological vector spaces (TVS) is complete if every net, or equivalently, every filter, that is Cauchy with respect to the space's  necessarily converges to some point. Said differently, a TVS is complete if its canonical uniformity is a complete uniformity. 
The canonical uniformity on a TVS  is the unique translation-invariant uniformity that induces on  the topology  
This notion of "TVS-completeness" depends  on vector subtraction and the topology of the TVS; consequently, it can be applied to all TVSs, including those whose topologies can not be defined in terms metrics or pseudometrics. 
A first-countable TVS is complete if and only if every Cauchy sequence (or equivalently, every elementary Cauchy filter) converges to some point.

Moreover, every Hausdorff TVS has a  completion, which is necessarily unique up to TVS-isomorphism. However, as discussed below, all TVSs have infinitely many non-Hausdorff completions that are  TVS-isomorphic to one another.

Definitions

This section summarizes the definition of a complete topological vector space (TVS) in terms of both nets and prefilters. 
Information about convergence of nets and filters, such as definitions and properties, can be found in the article about filters in topology.

Every topological vector space (TVS) is a commutative topological group with identity under addition and the canonical uniformity of a TVS is defined  in terms of subtraction (and thus addition); scalar multiplication is not involved and no additional structure is needed.

Canonical uniformity

 
and for any  the / is the set

where if  then  contains the diagonal 

If  is any neighborhood basis at the origin in  then the family of subsets of  

is a prefilter on  
If  is the neighborhood filter at the origin in  then  forms a base of entourages for a uniform structure on  that is considered canonical. 
Explicitly, by definition,   is the filter  on  generated by the above prefilter: 

The same canonical uniformity would result by using a neighborhood basis of the origin rather the filter of all neighborhoods of the origin. If  is any neighborhood basis at the origin in  then the filter on  generated by the prefilter  is equal to the canonical uniformity  induced by

Cauchy net

The general theory of uniform spaces has its own definition of a "Cauchy prefilter" and "Cauchy net". For the canonical uniformity on  these definitions reduce down to those given below.

The product  becomes a directed set by declaring  if and only if  and  
Then 

and similarly their  is defined to be the image of the product net under the vector subtraction map :
 
In particular, the notation  denotes the -indexed net  and not the -indexed net  since using the latter as the definition would make the notation useless.

A net  in a TVS  is called a Cauchy net if 
 
A Cauchy sequence is a sequence that is also a Cauchy net.

This proves that every convergent net is a Cauchy net. 
By definition, a space is called  if the converse is also always true. 
That is,  is complete if and only if the following holds: 
whenever  is a net in  then  converges (to some point) in  if and only if  in  
A similar characterization of completeness holds if filters and prefilters are used instead of nets.

Every convergent series is necessarily a Cauchy series. In a complete TVS, every Cauchy series is necessarily a convergent series.

Cauchy filter and Cauchy prefilter

A prefilter  on an topological vector space  is called a Cauchy prefilter if it satisfies any of the following equivalent conditions: 
 in  
 The family  is a prefilter.
 Explicitly,  means that for every neighborhood  of the origin in  there exist  such that 
 in  
 Explicitly,  means that for every neighborhood  of the origin in  there exists some  such that 
For every neighborhood  of the origin in   contains some -small set (that is, there exists some  such that ).
 A subset  is called -small or   if 
 This statement remains true if "" is replaced with ""
Every neighborhood of the origin in  contains some subset of the form  where  and 
A Cauchy filter is a Cauchy prefilter that is also a filter on 

Complete subset

A subset  of a TVS  is called a  if it satisfies any of the following equivalent conditions: 
Every Cauchy prefilter  on  converges to at least one point of 
 If  is Hausdorff then every prefilter on  will converge to at most one point of  But if  is not Hausdorff then a prefilter may converge to multiple points in  The same is true for nets.
Every Cauchy net in  converges to at least one point of 
 is a complete uniform space (under the point-set topology definition of "complete uniform space") when  is endowed with the uniformity induced on it by the canonical uniformity of 

Importantly, : If  is not Hausdorff and if every Cauchy prefilter on  converges to some point of  then  will be complete even if some or all Cauchy prefilters on   converge to points(s) in  In short, there is no requirement that these Cauchy prefilters on  converge  to points in  The same can be said of the convergence of Cauchy nets in 

This example also shows that complete subsets (and indeed, even compact subsets) of a non-Hausdorff TVS may fail to be closed. For example, if  then  if and only if  is closed in

Complete topological vector space

A topological vector space  is called a  if any of the following equivalent conditions are satisfied:

 is a complete uniform space when it is endowed with its canonical uniformity.
When  is a TVS, the topology induced by the canonical uniformity is equal to 's given topology (so convergence in this induced topology is just the usual convergence in ).
 is a complete subset of itself.
There exists a neighborhood of the origin in  that is also a complete subset of 
 This implies that every locally compact TVS is complete (even if the TVS is not Hausdorff).
 If  is Hausdorff then every prefilter on  will converge to at most one point of  But if  is not Hausdorff then a prefilter may converge to multiple points in  The same is true for nets.

where if in addition  is pseudometrizable or metrizable (for example, a normed space) then this list can be extended to include:

 is sequentially complete.

A topological vector space  is  if any of the following equivalent conditions are satisfied:
 is a sequentially complete subset of itself.

Uniqueness of the canonical uniformity

The existence of the canonical uniformity was demonstrated above by defining it. The theorem below establishes that the canonical uniformity of any TVS  is the only uniformity on  that is both (1) translation invariant, and (2) generates on  the topology 

This section is dedicated to explaining the precise meanings of the terms involved in this uniqueness statement.

Uniform spaces and translation-invariant uniformities

For any subsets  let

and let

For every  there exists some  such that 
For every  there exists some  such that 

The canonical uniformity on any TVS is translation-invariant.

The binary operator  satisfies all of the following:
If  and  then 
Associativity: 
Identity: 
Zero: 

Symmetric entourages

Call a subset  symmetric if  which is equivalent to  
This equivalence follows from the identity  and the fact that if  then  if and only if  
For example, the set  is always symmetric for every  

Topology generated by a uniformity

Relatives

Let  be arbitrary and let  be the canonical projections onto the first and second coordinates, respectively.

For any  define 

where  (respectively) is called the set of left (respectively, right) -relatives of (points in)  

If  then
 
Moreover,  right distributes over both unions and intersections, meaning that if  then  and 

Neighborhoods and open sets

Let  be a base of entourages on  The  at a point  and, respectively, on a subset  are the families of sets: 

Assign to every  the neighborhood prefilter 

Explicitly, a subset  is open in this topology if and only if for every  there exists some  such that  that is,  is open if and only if for every  there exists some  such that 

The closure of a subset  in this topology is: 

Cauchy prefilters and complete uniformities

A prefilter  on a uniform space  with uniformity  is called a Cauchy prefilter if for every entourage  there exists some  such that 

Case of a topological vector space

If  is a topological vector space then for any  and  

Uniform continuity

Let  and  be TVSs,  and  be a map. Then  is  if for every neighborhood  of the origin in  there exists a neighborhood  of the origin in  such that for all  if  then 

Suppose that  is uniformly continuous. If  is a Cauchy net in  then  is a Cauchy net in  

TVS completeness vs completeness of (pseudo)metrics

Preliminaries: Complete pseudometric spaces

We review the basic notions related to the general theory of complete pseudometric spaces. 
Recall that every metric is a pseudometric and that a pseudometric  is a metric if and only if  implies  Thus every metric space is a pseudometric space and a pseudometric space  is a metric space if and only if  is a metric.

Suppose  is a pseudometric space.

A Cauchy sequence is a sequence that is also a Cauchy net.

The pseudometric space  is a complete (resp. a sequentially complete) pseudometric space if and only if  is a complete (resp. a sequentially complete) uniform space. 
Moreover, the pseudometric space  (resp. the uniform space ) is complete if and only if it is sequentially complete.

Every Cauchy prefilter on  converges to at least one point of 
The above statement but with the word "prefilter" replaced by "filter."
Every Cauchy net in  converges to at least one point of 
 If  is a metric on  then any limit point is necessarily unique and the same is true for limits of Cauchy prefilters on 
Every Cauchy sequence in  converges to at least one point of 
The canonical uniformity on  induced by the pseudometric  is a complete uniformity.

And if addition  is a metric then we may add to this list:
Every decreasing sequence of closed balls whose diameters shrink to  has non-empty intersection.

Complete pseudometrics and complete TVSs

Every F-space, and thus also every Fréchet space, Banach space, and Hilbert space is a complete TVS. Note that every F-space is a Baire space but there are normed spaces that are Baire but not Banach.

A pseudometric  on a vector space  is said to be a  if  for all vectors 

If  is translation-invariant, then  is a complete TVS if and only if  is a complete pseudometric space. 

Complete norms and equivalent norms

Two norms on a vector space are called equivalent if and only if they induce the same topology.
See this footnote for an example of a continuous norm on a Banach space that is not is  equivalent to that Banach space's given norm. 
All norms on a finite-dimensional vector space are equivalent and every finite-dimensional normed space is a Banach space. Every Banach space is a complete TVS. A normed space is a Banach space (that is, its canonical norm-induced metric is complete) if and only if it is complete as a topological vector space.

Completions

A completion of a TVS  is a complete TVS that contains a dense vector subspace that is TVS-isomorphic to  In other words, it is a complete TVS  into which  can be TVS-embedded as a dense vector subspace. Every TVS-embedding is a uniform embedding.

Every topological vector space has a completion. Moreover, every Hausdorff TVS has a  completion, which is necessarily unique up to TVS-isomorphism. However, all TVSs, even those that are Hausdorff, (already) complete, and/or metrizable have infinitely many non-Hausdorff completions that are  TVS-isomorphic to one another.

Examples of completions

Similarly, the completion of the injective tensor product of the space of scalar-valued -test functions with such a TVS  is TVS-isomorphic to the analogously defined TVS of -valued  test functions.

Non-uniqueness of all completions

As the example below shows, regardless of whether or not a space is Hausdorff or already complete, every topological vector space (TVS) has infinitely many non-isomorphic completions.

However, every Hausdorff TVS has a  completion that is unique up to TVS-isomorphism. But nevertheless, every Hausdorff TVS still has infinitely many non-isomorphic non-Hausdorff completions.

Example (Non-uniqueness of completions): 
Let  denote any complete TVS and let  denote any TVS endowed with the indiscrete topology, which recall makes  into a complete TVS. 

Hausdorff completions

Every Hausdorff TVS has a  completion that is unique up to TVS-isomorphism. But nevertheless, as shown above, every Hausdorff TVS still has infinitely many non-isomorphic non-Hausdorff completions.

Existence of Hausdorff completions

If  is a Cauchy filter on  then the filter generated by the following prefilter:

is the unique minimal Cauchy filter on  that is contained as a subset of  

Endow  with the following vector space structure: 

For every balanced neighborhood  of the origin in  let

If  is Hausdorff then the collection of all sets  as  ranges over all balanced neighborhoods of the origin in  forms a vector topology on  making  into a complete Hausdorff TVS. Moreover, the map  is a TVS-embedding onto a dense vector subspace of 

If  is a metrizable TVS then a Hausdorff completion of  can be constructed using equivalence classes of Cauchy sequences instead of minimal Cauchy filters.

Non-Hausdorff completions

This subsection details how every non-Hausdorff TVS  can be TVS-embedded onto a dense vector subspace of a complete TVS. The proof that every Hausdorff TVS has a Hausdorff completion is widely available and so this fact will be used (without proof) to show that every non-Hausdorff TVS also has a completion. These details are sometimes useful for extending results from Hausdorff TVSs to non-Hausdorff TVSs.

is a TVS-isomorphism. 
Let  denote the inverse of this canonical map. (As a side note, it follows that every open and every closed subset  of  satisfies )

The Hausdorff TVS  can be TVS-embedded, say via the map  onto a dense vector subspace of its completion  
Let  denote the identity map and observe that the product map  is a TVS-embedding whose image is dense in  
Define the map

which is a TVS-embedding of  onto a dense vector subspace of the complete TVS  

is a well-defined TVS-embedding of  onto a dense vector subspace of the complete TVS  where moreover,

Topology of a completion

is a neighborhood basis at the origin in 

Grothendieck's Completeness Theorem

Assume that every  is endowed with the weak-* topology. 

Properties preserved by completions

If a TVS  has any of the following properties then so does its completion:
Hausdorff
Locally convex
Pseudometrizable
Metrizable
Seminormable
Normable
 Moreover, if  is a normed space, then the completion can be chosen to be a Banach space  such that the TVS-embedding of  into  is an isometry.
Hausdorff pre-Hilbert. That is, a TVS induced by an inner product.
Nuclear
Barrelled
Mackey
DF-space

Completions of Hilbert spaces

Other preserved properties

The completion of the projective tensor product of two nuclear spaces is nuclear. The completion of a nuclear space is TVS-isomorphic with a projective limit of Hilbert spaces.

If  (meaning that the addition map  is a TVS-isomorphism) has a Hausdorff completion  then  

Properties of maps preserved by extensions to a completion

If  is a nuclear linear operator between two locally convex spaces and if  be a completion of  then  has a unique continuous linear extension to a nuclear linear operator 

Let  and  be two Hausdorff TVSs with  complete. Let  be a completion of  Let  denote the vector space of continuous linear operators and let  denote the map that sends every to its unique continuous linear extension on  Then  is a (surjective) vector space isomorphism. Moreover,  maps families of equicontinuous subsets onto each other.

Examples and sufficient conditions for a complete TVS

Any TVS endowed with the trivial topology is complete and every one of its subsets is complete. Moreover, every TVS with the trivial topology is compact and hence locally compact. Thus a complete seminormable locally convex and locally compact TVS need not be finite-dimensional if it is not Hausdorff.
An arbitrary product of complete (resp. sequentially complete, quasi-complete) TVSs has that same property. If all spaces are Hausdorff, then the converses are also true. A product of Hausdorff completions of a family of (Hausdorff) TVSs is a Hausdorff completion of their product TVS. More generally, an arbitrary product of complete subsets of a family of TVSs is a complete subset of the product TVS.
The projective limit of a projective system of Hausdorff complete (resp. sequentially complete, quasi-complete) TVSs has that same property. A projective limit of Hausdorff completions of an inverse system of (Hausdorff) TVSs is a Hausdorff completion of their projective limit.
If  is a closed vector subspace of a complete pseudometrizable TVS  then the quotient space  is complete.
Suppose  is a  vector subspace of a metrizable TVS  If the quotient space  is complete then so is  However, there exists a complete TVS  having a closed vector subspace  such that the quotient TVS  is  complete.
Every F-space, Fréchet space, Banach space, and Hilbert space is a complete TVS.
Strict LF-spaces and strict LB-spaces are complete.
Suppose that  is a dense subset of a TVS  If every Cauchy filter on  converges to some point in  then  is complete.
The Schwartz space of smooth functions is complete.
The spaces of distributions and test functions is complete.
In particular, the strong dual of a bornological space is complete. However, it need not be bornological.
Every quasi-complete DF-space is complete.

Properties

Complete TVSs

Every TVS has a completion and every Hausdorff TVS has a Hausdorff completion. 
Every complete TVS is quasi-complete space and sequentially complete. 
However, the converses of the above implications are generally false. 
There exists a sequentially complete locally convex TVS that is not quasi-complete.

If a TVS has a complete neighborhood of the origin then it is complete. 
Every complete metrizable TVS is a barrelled space and a Baire space (and thus non-meager). 
The dimension of a complete metrizable TVS is either finite or uncountable.

Cauchy nets and prefilters

Any neighborhood basis of any point in a TVS is a Cauchy prefilter.

Every convergent net (respectively, prefilter) in a TVS is necessarily a Cauchy net (respectively, a Cauchy prefilter). 
Any prefilter that is subordinate to (that is, finer than) a Cauchy prefilter is necessarily also a Cauchy prefilter and any prefilter finer than a Cauchy prefilter is also a Cauchy prefilter. 
The filter associated with a sequence in a TVS is Cauchy if and only if the sequence is a Cauchy sequence. 
Every convergent prefilter is a Cauchy prefilter.

If a Cauchy filter in a TVS has an accumulation point  then it converges to 

Uniformly continuous maps send Cauchy nets to Cauchy nets. 

Every Cauchy sequence is a bounded subset but this is not necessarily true of Cauchy net. For example, let  have it usual order, let  denote any preorder on the non-indiscrete TVS  (that is,  does not have the trivial topology; it is also assumed that ) and extend these two preorders to the union  by declaring that  holds for every  and  

Suppose that  is a family of TVSs and that  denotes the product of these TVSs. Suppose that for every index  is a prefilter on  Then the product of this family of prefilters is a Cauchy filter on  if and only if each is a Cauchy filter on

Maps

Uniformly continuous extensions

Suppose that  is a uniformly continuous map from a dense subset  of a TVS  into a complete Hausdorff TVS  Then  has a unique uniformly continuous extension to all of  
If in addition  is a homomorphism then its unique uniformly continuous extension is also a homomorphism. 
This remains true if "TVS" is replaced by "commutative topological group." 
The map  is not required to be a linear map and that  is not required to be a vector subspace of 

Uniformly continuous linear extensions

Suppose  be a continuous linear operator between two Hausdorff TVSs.

Subsets

Complete subsets

Every complete subset of a TVS is sequentially complete. 
A complete subset of a Hausdorff TVS  is a closed subset of 

Every compact subset of a TVS is complete (even if the TVS is not Hausdorff or not complete). 
Closed subsets of a complete TVS are complete; however, if a TVS  is not complete then  is a closed subset of  that is not complete. 
The empty set is complete subset of every TVS. 

Topological complements

If  is a non-normable Fréchet space on which there exists a continuous norm then  contains a closed vector subspace that has no topological complement. 

Subsets of completions

Let  be a separable locally convex metrizable topological vector space and let  be its completion. If  is a bounded subset of  then there exists a bounded subset  of  such that 

Relation to compact subsets

A subset of a TVS ( assumed to be Hausdorff or complete) is compact if and only if it is complete and totally bounded. 
Thus a closed and totally bounded subset of a complete TVS is compact.

In a Hausdorff locally convex TVS, the convex hull of a precompact set is again precompact. Consequently, in a complete locally convex Hausdorff TVS, the closed convex hull of a compact subset is again compact.

The convex hull of compact subset of a Hilbert space is  necessarily closed and so also  necessarily compact. However, like in all complete Hausdorff locally convex spaces, the  convex hull  of this compact subset is compact. This shows that in a Hausdorff locally convex space that is not complete, the closed convex hull of compact subset might  to be compact (although it will be precompact/totally bounded).

Every complete totally bounded set is relatively compact. 
If  is any TVS then the quotient map  is a closed map and thus  A subset  of a TVS  is totally bounded if and only if its image under the canonical quotient map  is totally bounded. Thus  is totally bounded if and only if  is totally bounded. In any TVS, the closure of a totally bounded subset is again totally bounded. 
In a locally convex space, the convex hull and the disked hull of a totally bounded set is totally bounded. If  is a subset of a TVS  such that every sequence in  has a cluster point in  then  is totally bounded.

If  is compact, then  and this set is compact. Thus the closure of a compact set is compact (that is, all compact sets are relatively compact). Thus the closure of a compact set is compact. Every relatively compact subset of a Hausdorff TVS is totally bounded.

In a complete locally convex space, the convex hull and the disked hull of a compact set are both compact. More generally, if  is a compact subset of a locally convex space, then the convex hull  (resp. the disked hull ) is compact if and only if it is complete. 
In particular, if  is not Hausdorff then there exist compact complete sets that are not closed.

See also

Notes

Proofs

Citations

Bibliography

  
  
  
  
  
  
  
  
  
  
  
  
  
  
  
  
  
  
  
  
  
 
  
  
  
  
  
  
  
  
  
  
  
  

Functional analysis
Topological vector spaces
Uniform spaces